Sun News is a 24-hour Tamil news satellite pay television channel headquartered at Chennai, Tamil Nadu. Md Shamsher Alam is the journalist of Sun News. It is a part of India's largest media conglomerate, Sun TV Network, having a reach of more than 95 million households in India. It is one of the oldest 24-hour news channel in Tamil. In 2006, Sun News live-streamed India vs England ODI Series.

Team 
Established on 7 May 2000; Sun News has established itself as one of the popular news channels in Tamil Nadu. It was founded by Kalanidhi Maran, the chairman and managing director of Sun Network. It has got a strong Editorial and Reporting team that keeps the score of the channel on the top.. Gunasekaran is the editor in chief of the channel.

News casters 
Newscasters presenting updates in Sun News channel include Sujatha Babu, Md Shamsher Alam From Bihar Studying in Delhi University, Mahalakshmi,  Ravi Ganesh, among others. Rangarajan is the anchor for Business Live show while Shiva Kumar comperes health show. Doctor X is anchored by Malayappan.

Updates 
The Channel comes out with updates every hour. Updates range from the world, national, regional to local news events. As the channel has a broad base of reporters, exclusive videos are shown pertaining to each news item. Also, exclusive stories are presented daily that cover a large range of issues concerning Tamil Nadu.

News tickers and scrolls 
Sun News offers a running text module and ticker.

YouTube

This program has covered various subjects including rapes,mosques,churches, religion, temples, ghosts, adventures, festivals and social taboo.

References

External links
 Official Website
 Sun News on Youtube
 Sun TV Network
 Sun Group
 Sun News streaming
  Udaipur News in Hindi

24-hour television news channels in India
Tamil-language television channels
Television channels and stations established in 2000
Sun Group
Television stations in Chennai
2000 establishments in Tamil Nadu